Peter Machado is an Indian prelate of the Roman Catholic Church. He was appointed Metropolitan Archbishop of Bangalore by Pope Francis and was installed in May 2018 as Archbishop of Bangalore.

Archbishop Peter Machado was born on 26 May 1954, in Honnavar. He was ordained a priest on 8 December 1978, for the Roman Catholic Diocese of Karwar, which had been created in 1976. He holds a doctorate in Canon Law from Pontifical Urban University, Rome, Italy.

He was appointed Bishop of Belgaum Diocese on 2 February 2006, and was ordained bishop on 30 March that year. Prior to his episcopal appointment, he completed doctoral studies in Rome in Canon Law and served as procurator, judicial vicar, consultor and secretary of the Karnataka Regional Bishops’ Laity Commission, based in Bangalore.

As the Metropolitan Archbishop of Bangalore, he's also the President of Karnataka Regional Catholic Bishops Council (KRCBC) and All Karnataka United Forum for Christian Human Rights.

References

External links

21st-century Roman Catholic archbishops in India
1954 births
Living people
People from Uttara Kannada
Pontifical Urban University alumni
Bishops appointed by Pope Francis